Dacha is a Ukrainian and Eastern European restaurant and bar in Hong Kong.

It was founded by Olena Smith and Oksana Shevchuk, sisters from Ukraine, who came to Hong Kong in 2005. Having found the local supply of Eastern European food insufficient in Hong Kong, in 2012, the sisters started their own online store Xytorok for Russian-style produce. Apart from importing ingredients from Ukraine, they offered fresh sour cream, cheeses, cakes and pelmeni. In 2015, they expanded their business into opening Dacha, an Eastern European restaurant in Central, Hong Kong.

The menu of the restaurant includes such dishes as vegetarian borsht, chicken Kiev, herring under a fur coat, home-made kielbasa, cabbage rolls, blini with caviar, medovik made of buckwheat honey, etc. It also offers a variety of dumplings including Russian pelmeni, Polish pierogi and South Caucasian manti.

In 2020, Lifestyle Asia listed Dacha among the top 10 places to eat dumplings in Hong Kong.

See also 
 List of Ukrainian restaurants
 Veselka — a Ukrainian restaurant in New York.

References

External links 
 

Restaurants in Hong Kong
Drinking establishments in Hong Kong
Ukrainian restaurants
Russian restaurants
Restaurants established in 2015
Central, Hong Kong